Reddyanus melanodactylus is a species of scorpion in the Buthidae family. It is native to Australia, and was first described by German arachnologist Ludwig Carl Christian Koch in 1867.

Distribution
The species is found mainly in eastern Queensland, extending into northern New South Wales at the southern end of its range.

References

 

 
melanodactylus
Scorpions of Australia
Endemic fauna of Australia
Fauna of New South Wales
Fauna of Queensland
Animals described in 1867
Taxa named by Ludwig Carl Christian Koch